Phosphoglycerate kinase 1 is an enzyme that in humans is encoded by the PGK1 gene.

Interactive pathway map

References

Further reading

External links 
 PDBe-KB provides an overview of all the structure information available in the PDB for Human Phosphoglycerate kinase 1